Cover is a drama thriller film produced and directed by Bill Duke and starring Aunjanue Ellis, Razaaq Adoti, Vivica A. Fox, and Leon. It opened at selective theaters on February 22, 2008.

Plot
A woman accused could be either a killer or a victim in this psychological drama from director Bill Duke. Valerie Mass is a God-fearing housewife and artist who one day finds herself in a situation she never imaged possible—being questioned on murder charges by no-nonsense police detective Hicks and Simmons, a district attorney eager to close this case.

As Valerie repeatedly insists she's not a murderer, she tells the story of the last several months of her life. Valerie's husband, Dutch, is a psychiatrist with a practice in Atlanta who was offered a high-paying job by his old friend Monica, who works at a hospital in Philadelphia. Dutch takes the job and Valerie dutifully follows, and she seeks solace in the women's support group at local church.

Dutch spends more and more time with drug-abusing Monica, her wealthy but uninterested husband, Kevin, and obsessively womanizing musician Ryan Chambers. As Valerie's marriage begins to fall apart, she suspects her husband is being unfaithful, but she's shocked to discover the truth is more complicated than she imagined.

Cast
Aunjanue Ellis as Valerie Mass 
Razaaq Adoti as Dutch Mass 
Vivica A. Fox as Zahara Milton 
Leon Robinson as Ryan Chambers 
Louis Gossett Jr. as Detective Hicks 
Paula Jai Parker as Monica Wilson 
Roger Guenveur Smith as Kevin Wilson 
Richard Gant as Robert Mass 
Mýa as Cynda 
Obba Babatundé as Attorney Miller 
Victoria Gabrielle Platt as Charlotte 
Clifton Davis as D.A. Simmons 
Patti LaBelle as Mrs. Persons 
Clayton Prince as Greg 
Tomorrow Baldwin Montgomery as Nicole Mass

Reception
On review aggregator website Metacritic, the film holds 30 out of a 100 based on 5 reviews, indicating "generally unfavorable reviews".

Peter Debruge of Variety criticized the director Bill Duke for "aims[ing] for social awareness, but deliver[ing] second-rate melodrama instead".

Lou Lumenick of the New York Post said that "[the film w]ould be a candidate for the year's most unintentionally funny movie so far - if it weren't also the most homophobic".

References

External links

2007 films
2000s thriller drama films
2007 LGBT-related films
African-American films
African-American LGBT-related films
American thriller drama films
American LGBT-related films
Bisexuality-related films
Films directed by Bill Duke
2007 drama films
2000s English-language films
2000s American films